The 1987–88 Idaho Vandals men's basketball team represented the University of Idaho during the 1987–88 NCAA Division I men's basketball season. Members of the Big Sky Conference, the Vandals were led by second-year head coach Tim Floyd and played their home games on campus at the Kibbie Dome in Moscow, Idaho.

At the conference tournament in Bozeman, Montana, the Vandals earned a bye into the semifinals, but lost to host Montana State for the second time in a week.

After the season in late April, Floyd left for New Orleans and assistant Kermit Davis was promoted to head coach.

Postseason result

|-
!colspan=6 style=| Non-conference regular season

|-
!colspan=6 style=| Big Sky tournament

References

External links
Sports Reference – Idaho Vandals: 1987–88 basketball season
Gem of the Mountains: 1988 University of Idaho yearbook – 1987–88 basketball season
Idaho Argonaut – student newspaper – 1988 editions

Idaho Vandals men's basketball seasons
Idaho
Idaho
Idaho